Philip Monroe (October 31, 1916 – July 13, 1988) was an American animator and director best known for working for Warner Bros. Cartoons under the supervision of Chuck Jones. Monroe had also worked for UPA.

Career

Monroe started working at Leon Schlesinger Productions (the company later known as Warner Bros. Cartoons) in June 1934. He was initially only an inbetweener. The studio at this point was loosely-enough organized to allow opportunities of rapid advancement for ambitious young inbetweeners,  like Monroe. According to a later interview with Monroe, "some guys" were content to be "inbetweeners all their lives", while others searched for opportunities to do something else and move up in the studio's hierarchy. Monroe himself managed to befriend animator Robert McKimson and served as his inbetweener for a while. He was soon promoted to become McKimson's assistant. By the end of 1935, Monroe had been promoted again and started serving as an animator in his own right.

Monroe is best known as an animator for Chuck Jones, but would also work with Friz Freleng, Bob Clampett and Frank Tashlin in the 1940s. He would be drafted into the United States Army Air Forces in 1943, but returned to the studio in 1946. Jones' considered him one of his favorite animators, along with Ken Harris, Ben Washam and Abe Levitow. He then went to John Sutherland Productions in 1950. In 1951, Monroe left for UPA, working under the supervision of John Hubley and Pete Burness. He eventually left UPA for political reasons, and in 1959 went back to Warners to head their commercial department, where he directed commercials featuring Charlie the Tuna. He eventually went back into the entertainment department as an animator in Jones' unit, and was chosen to finish two shorts (The Iceman Ducketh, Woolen Under Where) under Chuck Jones' unit after Jones was fired. After Warner Bros. Cartoons closed in 1963, Monroe did many animation stints until he ended up at Chuck Jones Productions. He would continue animating for Jones until his retirement. He also went to Warner Bros. Animation, teaming up, again, with Friz Freleng and Jones, on The Bugs Bunny/Road Runner Movie, The Looney, Looney, Looney Bugs Bunny Movie, and Daffy Duck's Fantastic Island. 

Monroe died from pancreatic cancer on July 13, 1988, aged 71.

References

Sources
 

1916 births
1988 deaths
American animators
American animated film directors
Warner Bros. Cartoons directors
Place of birth missing